Tom Moreland Interchange, colloquially known as Spaghetti Junction, is the interchange of Interstate 85 (I-85) and I-285, along with several access roads, in northern DeKalb County, Georgia, northeast of Atlanta and just to the south of Norcross in Gwinnett County. It is named for Tom Moreland, a former commissioner of the Georgia Department of Transportation (GDOT) from 1975 to 1987.

I-85 is a major traffic corridor from the northeastern suburbs of Atlanta in the Gwinnett County area into downtown Atlanta. I-285 is a beltway around Atlanta. In the northern I-285 corridor, in the area from I-85 counterclockwise to I-75, there has been a large amount of development of office space. Spaghetti Junction was designed to remove choke points and reduce congestion in the I-85 and I-285 interchange, which had been a cloverleaf.

Description

The interchange is a stack interchange. Because of a northeast-to-southwest ramp that passes over the fourth level of the interchange, Spaghetti Junction is a five-level stack interchange, not a traditional four-level stack. It contains additional ramps to accommodate traffic on four nearby side roads: Buford Highway/US 23, Chamblee–Tucker Road, Pleasantdale Road, and Northcrest Road. The interchange handles approximately 300,000 vehicles each day. It has 14 bridges, the highest rising , running from Northcrest Road to I-85 south.

History
The Tom Moreland Interchange was designed to replace a cloverleaf interchange dating back to 1958 that had earned the nickname "Malfunction Junction", and was redesigned and reconstructed as part of the Freeing the Freeways program to relieve congestion on Atlanta-area interstates. HNTB served as the design consultant for the new interchange. In order to fast-track the construction, bidding contractors were required to choose from three major designs for the six major bridges: precast concrete segmental girders, welded steel-plate box girders, and cast-in-place concrete segmental box girders. The winning bidder chose the latter design.

The contract for reconstruction of the interchange was awarded in October 1982 at a cost of $62.5 million (equivalent to $ in ), which was, at the time, the most expensive contract ever awarded by GDOT. Work began on January 10, 1983. On August 24, 1985, the first flyover ramp of the interchange opened, connecting I-85 northbound to I-285 westbound. Initially expected to be completed in June 1986, the project was completed on July 9, 1987, in a ribbon-cutting ceremony. The final cost also ballooned to $86 million (equivalent to $ in ).

Origin of nickname
The actual origin of the name, "Spaghetti Junction" in Atlanta is attributed to traffic reporter Dave Straub. As construction was about midway completed on the massive  ramp system, Straub was flying over it in a helicopter reporting a traffic jam and commented that it was beginning to look like an "overturned bowl of Spaghetti". He then commented, "I think I'll start calling it 'Spaghetti Junction.'" Listeners complained about Straub's use of the "food reference" in his traffic reports, but Straub insisted that it would become a household term. And it did. He stuck with it, and soon, merchants began advertising their locations as being just north or south of "Spaghetti Junction". While it is officially named "The Tom Moreland Interchange"  in honor of its designer,  that reference is rarely used and "Spaghetti Junction"  is a major landmark in the city of Atlanta and beyond.

In popular culture

The interchange's colloquial name of "Spaghetti Junction" is mentioned in an eponymous song by the Atlanta-based hip hop group Outkast in their 2000 album Stankonia and in the film Baby Driver, which is set in Atlanta.

The interchange has also been pictured on a 2017 album cover, Quality Control: Control the Streets Volume 1. The album features many rising artists that call Atlanta their home, including Migos, Lil Yachty, and Young Thug.

References

Transportation in Georgia (U.S. state)
Interstate 85
Road interchanges in the United States
U.S. Route 23
Doraville, Georgia